Copper Lake may refer to:

 Copper Lake (Nova Scotia, Canada)
 Copper Lake (Whatcom County, Washington)